Adiperanda is a village near Nemmara in Palakkad district, Kerala, India.

References

Villages in Palakkad district